Major-General William Craven, 1st Earl of Craven (28 September 1770 – 30 July 1825) was a British soldier.

Early life

Craven was the eldest son of William Craven, 6th Baron Craven, and his wife Lady Elizabeth Berkeley. Among his siblings was Maria Craven (wife of William Molyneux, 2nd Earl of Sefton) and Arabella Craven (wife of General the Hon. Frederick St John). In 1780, after thirteen years of marriage, and reported affairs on both sides, his parents parted permanently. After the death of his father in 1791, his mother married Charles Alexander, Margrave of Brandenburg-Ansbach. Charles' wife, Princess Frederica Caroline of Saxe-Coburg-Saalfeld, also died earlier in 1791.

His paternal grandfather was the Rev. John Craven, brother of William Craven, 5th Baron Craven, who his father succeeded as Baron Craven in 1769. His maternal grandparents were Augustus Berkeley, 4th Earl of Berkeley and the former Elizabeth Drax (a daughter of Henry Drax).

Career
He succeeded his father as seventh Baron Craven in 1791. In 1801 he was created Viscount Uffington, in the County of Berkshire, and Earl of Craven, in the County of York. The earldom was a revival of the title held by his 17th-century kinsman and namesake William Craven, 1st Earl of Craven.

He was commissioned into the 43rd (Monmouthshire) Regiment of Foot in 1793, and subsequently served with the 80th and 84th Regiments. In 1798, Craven was appointed aide-de-camp to King George III, serving until 1805. This was followed by active service in the Netherlands and the Mediterranean, ultimately achieving the rank of Major-general.

From 1819 until his death in 1825, Lord Craven served as Lord Lieutenant of Berkshire and was opposed to Catholic emancipation.

Marriage & issue
In 1807, Craven married Louisa Brunton, a famous actress. Louisa was a daughter of John Brunton, a grocer who later became an actor and manager of the Norwich Theatre. She was one of seven sisters, several were actresses, one, Ann Brunton Merry married the poet and dilettante Robert Merry.

Together, they were the parents of:

 William Craven, 2nd Earl of Craven (1809–1866), who married Lady Emily Mary Grimston, the second daughter of James Grimston, 1st Earl of Verulam.
 Hon. George Augustus Craven (1810–1836), an Army Officer who married Georgina Smythe (1814-1868), a daughter of Walter Smythe.  Georgina's aunt (Walter's sister), Maria, was a longtime companion of George IV before he became king. After Craven's death, Georgina married Edmond, Duc de la Force.
 Hon. Frederick Keppel Craven (1812–1864), a prominent cricketer.
 Lady Louisa Elizabeth Craven (d. 1858), who married Sir Frederick Johnstone, 7th Baronet. After his death, she married Alexander Oswald, a Member of Parliament for Ayrshire.

Lord Craven mostly resided at Coombe Abbey, near Coventry in Warwickshire and occasionally at Hamstead Marshall in Berkshire.  He is not entirely forgotten – Harriette Wilson begins her famous memoir, "I shall not say why and how I became, at the age of fifteen, the mistress of the Earl of Craven."

He died in July 1825, aged 54, and was succeeded in his titles by his son William.

References

External links

1770 births
1825 deaths
British Army major generals
Lord-Lieutenants of Berkshire
People from Coventry
William
7
Earls of Craven (1801 creation)